The Brahms-Preis (Brahms Prize) has been awarded by the Brahms Society of Schleswig-Holstein since 1988. The prize is furnished with 10,000 euros. It rewards artists who have contributed mesmerizing work for the preservation of the artistic heritage of Johannes Brahms.

Winners

1988: Leonard Bernstein and the Vienna Philharmonic
1990: Yehudi Menuhin, violinist and conductor
1993: Lisa Smirnova, pianist
1994: Philharmonie der Nationen (Philharmonic of the Nations)
1995: Hanno Müller-Brachmann, bass-baritone
1996: Professors Renate and Kurt Hofmann, Brahms-Institut Lübeck
1997: Detlef Kraus, pianist
1998: Dietrich Fischer-Dieskau, baritone
1999: , baritone
2000: Christian Tetzlaff, violinist
2001: Sabine Meyer, clarinetist
2002: Thomanerchor
2003: , sculptor
2004: Lars Vogt, pianist
2005: Dresdner Kreuzchor
2006: Musikhochschule Lübeck, Brahms-Institut
2007: Thomas Quasthoff, baritone
2008: Simone Young and the Hamburg Philharmonic
2009: Gerhard Oppitz, pianist
2011: Anne-Sophie Mutter, violinist
2012: Fauré Quartet, piano quartet
2013:  and the Flensburger Bach-Chor
2015: Thomas Hengelbrock, conductor
2016: Christoph Eschenbach, pianist and conductor
2017: Herbert Blomstedt, conductor
2018: Christiane Karg, soprano
2020: Midori, violinist
2023:  and the Madrigalchor Kiel

References

External links

German music awards
Culture of Schleswig-Holstein
Awards established in 1987
Classical music awards
Johannes Brahms